The Satai class (サタイ) class locomotives were a class of large steam tank locomotives of the Chosen Government Railway (Sentetsu) with 2-10-2T wheel arrangement. The "Sata" name came from the American naming system for steam locomotives, under which locomotives with 2-10-2 wheel arrangement were called "Santa Fe".

Description
The Satai class were large tank locomotives with high tractive effort, designed specifically for use on mountainous lines. Designed locally, a total of 24 were delivered to Sentetsu, the first four being built in 1934 at the Gyeongseong Works, and the last five in 1939 by Hitachi. Originally numbered 1801 through 1819, they received the サタイ1 through サタイ19 numbers in Sentetsu's general renumbering of 1938, while サタイ20–サタイ24 were built in 1939, after the new numbering system was introduced.

Postwar
In the division of railway assets between North and South, sixteen of the Satai class locomotives went to the Korean State Railway in the North, designated 사다하 (Sadaha) class, and eight to the Korean National Railroad in the South, as 사타 (Sata) class.

Construction

References

Locomotives of Korea
Locomotives of North Korea
Locomotives of South Korea
Railway locomotives introduced in 1934
2-10-2 locomotives
Gyeongseong Works locomotives
Hitachi locomotives